Nedra albiclava is a moth in the family Noctuidae. It is found in South America, including and possibly restricted to its type location Peru.

References

Xyleninae